Tadese Takele Bikila (born 3 August 2002) is an Ethiopian athlete.

He won the Ethiopian Olympic Trial in June 2021 in the 3000m steeplechase, running a personal best of 8:09:37 to beat Abrham Sime and Hailemariyam Amare. Later that month he finished second behind Soufiane El Bakkali in steeplechase in the Diamond League meeting in Florence, running 8:10:56. Competing at the Athletics at the 2020 Summer Olympics – Men's 3000 metres steeplechase he finished ninth in heat three.

References

External links
 
 
 

2002 births
Living people
Ethiopian male steeplechase runners
Olympic athletes of Ethiopia
Athletes (track and field) at the 2020 Summer Olympics
21st-century Ethiopian people